Eglantyne Jebb  (25 August 1876 – 17 December 1928) was a British social reformer who founded the Save the Children organisation at the end of the First World War to relieve the effects of famine in Austria-Hungary and Germany. She drafted the document that became the Declaration of the Rights of the Child.

Early life and family
Eglantyne Jebb was born in 1876 in Ellesmere, Shropshire, daughter of Arthur Jebb and his wife and cousin, Eglantyne Louisa Jebb, and grew up at "The Lyth", her family's estate. The Jebbs were a well-off family with a strong social conscience and commitment to public service. Her mother had founded the Home Arts and Industries Association, to promote Arts and Crafts among young people in rural areas; her sister Louisa would help found the Women's Land Army in World War I. Another sister, Dorothy, who married the Labour MP Charles Roden Buxton, campaigned against the demonisation of the German people after the war and served as a faculty member at Wellesley College, Massachusetts, United States in 1929, teaching courses in English literature. A paternal aunt, a Victorian "new woman", introduced her and her siblings to carpentry, fishing and melting lead to cast bullets, and inspired her to go to University at a time when very few women did.

Social activism, Cambridge 1900–1918 
From 1895 until 1898 Jebb studied history at Lady Margaret Hall, Oxford, to become a school teacher. After a year's experience as a primary school teacher at St. Peter's Junior School in Marlborough, she was convinced that this was not her vocation, though it had increased her awareness of the difficulties and widespread nature of poverty faced by young children.

She moved to Cambridge to look after her sick mother. There, encouraged by Mary Marshall and Florence Keynes, she became involved in the Charity Organisation Society, which aimed to bring a modern scientific approach to charity work. This led her to carry out an extensive research project into conditions in the city. In 1906 she published a book, Cambridge, a Study in Social Questions based on her research.

In the run-up to the First World War the Cambridge Independent Press, a weekly Liberal-supporting newspaper, published a number of articles covering Eglantyne's campaigning and political activities in Cambridge. In 1907, she was appointed to the Education Committee of Cambridge Borough Council, although in her first year she only attended 13 of a possible 31 meetings. She was also on the committee of the newly formed "League for Physical Education and Improvement", but resigned citing pressures from other workloads.

Under the supervision of Florence Keynes, Eglantyne and Florence's daughter Margaret Hill set up and ran the Boys' Employment Registry, shortly followed by a similar one for girls. In 2014 a blue plaque was mounted above 82 Regent Street where the employment registry was sited.

In 1913 she was influenced by Charles Roden Buxton to undertake a journey to Macedonia on behalf of the Macedonian Relief Fund. She returned shortly before the First World War broke out, and soon was drawn into a project organised by Dorothy, who had begun importing European newspapers – including ones from Germany and Austria-Hungary for which a special license had to be obtained from the government – and publishing extracts in English in the Cambridge Magazine, which revealed that everyday life in the enemy countries was far worse than government propaganda suggested.

Geneva 1918–1928
Eglantyne spent her last ten years in Geneva. As the First World War was coming to an end and the German and Austro-Hungarian economies came near to collapse, it was clear to Dorothy and Eglantyne that the children of these countries were suffering appallingly from the effects of the war and the Allied blockade, which continued even when an armistice was signed. In 1919 a pressure group, the "Fight the Famine Council" was set up to persuade the British government to end the blockade.

Save the Children Fund 

Jebb's focus shifted to organising relief. On 15 April 1919, the Council set up a fund to raise money for the German and Austrian children – the Save the Children Fund. Unexpectedly, this organisation, launched at the Royal Albert Hall in London on 19 May 1919, quickly raised a large sum of money from the British public, and officials were dispatched to organise relief work.

The success of the Fund led her and her sister Dorothy to attempt to set up an international movement for children. In 1920, the International Save the Children Union (Union International de Secours à l'Enfant) was founded in Geneva, with the British Save the Children Fund and the Swedish Rädda Barnen as leading members. 

In London, Jebb was in charge, and she ensured that the Fund adopted the professional approach she had learnt in the Charity Organisation Society. A manager, Lewis Golden, was recruited to put the organisation on a businesslike foundation. He adopted the innovative – and controversial – approach of taking full-page advertisements in national newspapers; it was highly effective, and raised very substantial amounts of income for the Fund's work.

As the problems in central Europe receded, a new focus of the Fund's attention became a refugee crisis in Greece and the surrounding areas, a consequence of the continuing conflict in the area. In 1921, just as this situation was coming under control, there was a new and bigger emergency, the Russian famine of 1921 affecting the people of Soviet Russia. A new fundraising effort brought a surge of donations, and a Save the Children team was dispatched to the city of Saratov, one of the main famine centres.

Declaration of the Rights of the Child, 1923/24 
In all the work the Fund did, a major element in Jebb's thinking was the importance of a planned, research-based approach. In 1923, when the Russian relief effort was coming to an end, and the Fund's income was sharply reducing, she turned to another issue, that of children's rights. Jebb headed to Geneva, to a meeting of the International Save the Children Union, with a plan for a Children's Charter. She drafted a short and clear document which asserted the rights of children and the duty of the international community to put children's rights at the forefront of planning. The Declaration of the Rights of the Child, or the Declaration of Geneva as it came to be known, was adopted in 1924 by the League of Nations.

With peace returning to Europe, and relief efforts in decline, the focus of the Save the Children movement shifted to promoting the Declaration. In 1925, the first International Child Welfare congress was held in Geneva. The Declaration was widely discussed and supported by organisations and governments.

Personal life

For several years prior to World War I, Jebb had what today would be respected as a lesbian relationship with Margaret Keynes (sister of Maynard Keynes). In their extensive correspondence, they shared their wish for a time when they could live together or even live as a married couple. The correspondence reveals a very loving and intense relationship. Sadly, the social mores of the time (and Margaret's mother's intentions for her daughter) meant that their relationship came to an end with Margaret's marriage to Archibald Hill in 1913.

After many years of ill health due to a thyroid problem, including three operations for goitre, Eglantyne Jebb died in a nursing home in Geneva in 1928, and is buried there in Saint George's cemetery. Her epitaph features a quote from Matthew 25:40: "Verily I say unto you, Inasmuch as ye have done it unto one of the least of these my brethren, ye have done it unto me."

Legacy
Save the Children, which Jebb and her sister Dorothy Buxton who converted to the Society of Friends with her husband founded in England in 1919 and as an international organisation based in Geneva the following year, remains active today. A blue plaque was put up in Marlborough to  "Eglantyne Jebb" who founded Save the Children. In error they used "Eglantyne Mary Jebb"'s name (a distant relative) by mistake and it was not corrected until 2019.

An expanded version of Jebb´s "Declaration of the Rights of the Child" was adopted by the United Nations in 1959, and was one of the main inspirations behind the 1989 UN Convention on the Rights of the Child.

The Church of England remembers her life and service annually with a commemoration on its liturgical calendar on 17 December.

Further reading 
Catalogue of Save the Children archives, Cadbury Research Library University of Birmingham.
Jebb Archive of the Canton of Geneva.

References 

Alumni of Lady Margaret Hall, Oxford
Anglican saints
1876 births
1928 deaths
People from Ellesmere, Shropshire
English philanthropists
20th-century Christian saints
British reformers
Christian female saints of the Late Modern era
Founders of charities
British social reformers
20th-century English women writers